Niz is a rural locality (a village) in Megrinskoye Rural Settlement, Chagodoshchensky District, Vologda Oblast, Russia. The population was 33 as of 2002.

Geography 
Lvov Dvor is the nearest rural locality.

References 

Rural localities in Chagodoshchensky District